Associazione Sportiva Dilettantistica Pro Romans, or simply Pro Romans, is an Italian association football club located in Romans d'Isonzo, Friuli-Venezia Giulia. It currently plays in Promozione Friuli-Venezia Giulia.

In 2012, it merged with A.S.D. Medea to form A.S.D. Pro Romans Medea.

History
The club was founded in 1921 as A.S. Pro Romans (it will become A.S.D. in 2004/05 for fiscal reasons), even if in 1916 the "Club Footbalistico Romans" was already present. The new Romans football reality was founded in the rooms of the "Al Leon d'Oro" restaurant in via Latina, the historic seat of the association, under the help of the owners of the same, the brothers Giorgio and Alberto Candussi, while as the first president of the newborn was Attilio Dessabo, popularly known as "Tilio Bocul".
Pro Romans matches were played in Campo Comunale in via Aquileia, which was subsequently modified and transformed as it still appears today, while the new one, in via Atleti Azzurri d'Italia, on which the senior team plays today, was inaugurated on 17 September 2000, and in 2002 named after the "Calligaris Brothers", that is Mario, Armando and Alessandro, three pioneers of Romans football. Three true glories of Italian football also passed through Pro Romans: the future Italian coach Enzo Bearzot, world champion in 1982 in Spain and Tarcisio Burgnich, later player for Udinese, Juventus, Inter and Napoli and vice-champion of the world in 1970.
After years in which satisfactions and bitterness alternate, in 1995 the great turning point of Pro Romans matures, with the entry into the club of the dynamic Silvano Lorenzon, who as president of the association takes an exciting cycle that brings the club, in 2003–04 to leap into Serie D, as well as winning the Regional Coppa Italia and reaching the quarter-finals of the Coppa Italia Dilettanti. It is the peak, then a slow decline begins. In 2012 the merger with ASD Medea arrives, which starts the current club on the banks of Isonzo river.

Recent seasons

Key

Honours
Eccellenza Friuli-Venezia Giulia (1st regional level)
Winners: 2003–04

Promozione Friuli-Venezia Giulia (2nd regional level)
Winners: 2000–01

Prima Categoria Friuli-Venezia Giulia (3rd regional level)
Winners: 1999–00

Coppa Italia Dilettanti Friuli-Venezia Giulia
Winners: 2003–04

Colors and badge 
ASD Pro Romans Medea colors are yellow and red.

References

External links
Official website 
Pro Romans page @ friuligol.it
Pro Romans page @ tuttocampo.it
Pro Romans page @ facebook.com

Pro Romans
Pro Romans
Pro Romans